Miguel Ângelo Falcão de Oliveira (born 4 January 1995) is a Portuguese professional motorcycle racer who competes in the MotoGP World Championship for RNF MotoGP Team, getting the step up from KTM Tech3, a satellite team, for whom he secured both the team's, and his, first and second win.

He finished as runner-up in the 2018 Moto2 World Championship.
He gained extensive experience in Moto3, having competed for the Estrella Galicia 0,0 team in 2012, the Mahindra Racing team in 2013 and 2014 and finishing runner-up with the Red Bull KTM Ajo team in 2015. At the 2015 Italian motorcycle Grand Prix, Oliveira achieved the first World Championship victory for a Portuguese rider.

Oliveira's father, a former motorcycle racer, always supported his son's love of racing and gave him his first quad-bike when he was four years old. He started racing in the national championship at nine years old, in the Portuguese MiniGP Championship in 2004, winning the Young Promise of the Year award in Portugal. His first successes came in 2005 when he won the Portuguese MiniGP Championship and Metrakit World Festival in Spain. In 2006 he repeated his earlier success and in 2007 he won the Mediterranean PreGP 125 Trophy. In 2009 he was third in the Spanish championship, and in 2010 battled Maverick Viñales for the title, eventually finishing runner-up by just two points and progressed to become the first full-time Portuguese rider to reach the world championship. Since then, he has become a race winner in all 3 classes.

Career

125cc/Moto3 World Championship

Andalucia Banca Civica (2011)

2011 was Oliveira's first season in Motorcycling Grand Prix, in the 125cc Championship with Andalucía-Cajasol team. The bike was an Aprilia. His best result was a 7th place at his home race at Estoril, having finished tenth on his début in Qatar. He achieved six top ten finishes in his first season, but did not compete in the final races after the team failed to secure financial support to end the season.

Estrella Galicia 0,0 (2012)
In 2012 he led some races before crashing out and got his first podium, a third place, in Catalunya. He improved on that result with a second place in Australia, and ended the season in eighth place in the championship standings.

Mahindra Racing (2013–2014) 
He was once again developing a new bike with Suter, with a Mahindra-badged engine – based on 2012's Honda unit – and he got the first podium for the Indian team in Sepang, with a third-place finish. He also achieved a pole position, eight top-five finishes and three fastest laps with the new bike that was underpowered compared to the KTM machinery.

For 2014 he was joined by Arthur Sissis – who was later replaced by Andrea Migno due to poor results – and he obtained a podium in Assen, a third place. He finished the season as the best Mahindra rider in the championship, in tenth place.

Red Bull KTM Ajo (2015)

After joining the Red Bull KTM Ajo team, he became the first Portuguese rider to win a motorcycle Grand Prix with a victory at Mugello. After taking a second victory in three races, at Assen, Oliveira suffered a heavy crash during the first practice session of the following Grand Prix in Germany which forced him to withdraw from the race due to a broken and displaced metacarpal in the left hand. Returning from injury in Indianapolis his best result in the following three races was an eighth-place finish at Brno. With only 6 races remaining in the season, Oliveira trailed championship leader Danny Kent by 110 points. Oliveira finished second at Misano, before winning at Aragon; he also pulled 35 points back on Kent over the two races. Another 35 points were pulled back on Kent, as Oliveira continued his top-two streak with second in Japan, and a victory at Phillip Island. The victory also stopped Kent from clinching the title – Oliveira trailed Kent by 40 points with 50 points available, and was the only rider that could catch Kent in the standings. Oliveira won again in Malaysia, and with Kent finishing seventh, Oliveira kept the title race alive heading to the final round in Valencia – 24 points behind, with 25 points available. Oliveira won the race, but with Kent finishing ninth after a three-rider collision in the last corner, Oliveira fell six points short.

Moto2 World Championship

Leopard Racing (2016) 
On 13 September 2015, it was announced that Oliveira would be moving up to the Moto2 class for the 2016 season, with Leopard Racing. He was joined in the team by his Moto3 championship rival Danny Kent. Oliveira achieved three Top 10 results with a 9th place in Le Mans, 8th place in Catalunya and another 9th place in Brno, before breaking his collarbone after a collision with Franco Morbidelli during practice for the Aragon Grand Prix. Morbidelli was later penalized for the crash with Oliveira missing out on the race. He returned for the Japanese Grand Prix and was initially declared fit by the medical team, but eventually did not start the race after assessing his condition during free practice. In consultation with the team it was later decided that Oliveira would also not start in the following races at Phillip Island and Sepang, where he was replaced by Alessandro Nocco. Before the Aragon crash Oliveira had been comfortably leading the standings for Rookie of the Year throughout the season and he was behind by only one point after missing four races and returning for the final race of the year in Valencia. He finished the race in a commendable 13th place, but fell short of clinching the trophy by a single point with eventual Rookie of the Year Xavi Vierge finishing just ahead of him in 12th place.

Red Bull KTM Ajo (2017–2018)

2017

For the 2017 season Oliveira returned to the Red Bull KTM Ajo team with KTM making their debut in the Moto2 class. On his return to the team he partnered his former Moto3 teammate Brad Binder. On 22 October, he achieved his first win in Moto2 and by doing so the first victory ever for KTM on the class. Oliveira also won the following race at Malaysia and closed the season with three consecutive wins. He finished in 3rd place of the riders' championship

2018
Oliveira remained with Red Bull KTM Ajo for 2018. He had a strong season from the off, achieving three wins, podium finishes in all but 6 of 18 races and only one finish outside the top ten. During the Spanish GP weekend it was announced he was selected to move to MotoGP the following season, riding for KTM's new satellite team Tech3. Oliviera finished in 2nd place of the riders' championship, merely 9 points behind champion Francesco Bagnaia.

MotoGP World Championship

Red Bull KTM Tech3 (2019–2020)

2019
Oliveira joined French team Tech3 as they switched to KTM satellite machinery for 2019. He managed 9 points finishes from the 16 races which he started. He sustained an injury in a crash with fellow KTM rider Johann Zarco at the British Grand Prix and further aggravated the injury with a free practice crash in Australia. Oliveira ultimately withdrew from the final three races of the season to undergo surgery on his shoulder. He finished the season with 33 points in 17th place, well ahead of Tech3 teammate Hafizh Syahrin.

2020
After Zarco's premature disembarkment from the KTM factory team, his seat for 2020 was offered to Oliveira who turned it down, electing to remain with Tech3 for a further season as planned. The factory seat ultimately went to Brad Binder, Oliveira's former Ajo teammate and originally-planned teammate at Tech3 for 2020.
During the delayed start to the 2020 season, Oliveira's 2020 season got off to a rough start, after two separate retirements caused by collisions with factory KTM riders in the first four rounds. At the Andalusian round after qualifying in fifth as the best KTM rider, Oliveira was struck by Binder in a racing incident in the first corner of the opening lap, knocking Oliveira out of the race. At the Austrian round, Oliviera collided with KTM factory rider Pol Espargaró when both went wide in turn 4, sending both into the gravel trap and retirement from the race. At the Styrian race, Oliveira started the final lap in third place, but ultimately took his maiden win with a final corner overtake of Espargaró and Jack Miller, who both went wide battling for first. The victory marked the first win for Tech3 in MotoGP and the first win ever for a Portuguese rider in the top class. After another five top-6 finishes in the second half of the season, Oliveira took his maiden MotoGP pole at the final round in Portimão and led from start to finish to claim his second win of the year. He ultimately finished ninth in the Championship, with 125 points.

Red Bull KTM Factory Racing (2021–2022)

2021

In 2021, Red Bull KTM Factory Racing revealed their 2021 line-up with Oliveira partnering Brad Binder once again in his career. Oliveira had a difficult start in the first five races of the season, with no top ten finishes and a DNF that put him in an early points deficit. KTM introduced a new chassis after the French Grand Prix and Oliveira's results improved dramatically, with two podium finishes and a win at Catalunya over a three race stretch. At the end, he finished fourteenth in the Championship, with 94 points.

2022
In 2022, he finished 10th in the standings with 149 points, scoring wins in Mandalika and Buriram.

RNF MotoGP Team (from 2023)

Personal life 
Oliveira is studying to become a dentist concurrently with his Grand Prix racing career.

In 2017, Miguel Oliveira initiated a pioneering pedagogic project in Portugal – the Oliveira Cup. This Motorcycle School Trophy, with his mentoring, is directed at young people from 10 to 14 years old, and aims to find his "successor". It enrolled 12 young riders for the first year.

In September 2020, Oliveira announced his engagement to Andreia Pimenta, daughter of his stepmother. Oliveira and Andreia Pimenta announced in 2021 they were expecting their first child.

Career highlights
 2004 – 4th place in Troféu Mini GP (Portuguese championship)
 2005 – 1st place in Metrakit World Festival (World champion), 1st place in Troféu Mini GP (Portuguese championship), 2nd place in Madrid Mini GP (Spanish championship)
 2006 – 1st place in RACE Madrid (Spanish Trophy), 1st place in Troféu Mini GP XL 70cc (Portuguese championship)
 2007 – 1st place in Troféu Open Racc Pre-125 (Spanish championship), 3rd place in Metrakit World Festival (World championship)
 2008 – 3rd place in Troféu Open Racc Pre-125 (Spanish championship), 8th place in Red Bull MotoGP Rookies Cup at Estoril, 1st place in Red Bull MotoGP Rookies Cup at Donington and Assen, 1st place in 250cc 4T at Jerez
 2009 – 3rd place in CEV final standings (Spanish championship), 5th place European 125GP
 2010 – 2nd place (runner-up) in the European 125GP championship, 2nd place (runner-up) in CEV (Spanish championship)
 2015 – 2nd in Moto3 World Championship (9 podiums, 6 wins)
 2017 – 3rd in Moto2 World Championship (9 podiums, 3 wins)
 2018 – 2nd in Moto2 World Championship (12 podiums, 3 wins)
 2020 – 1st win in MotoGP World Championship (Styrian Grand Prix), 1st place in Portuguese Grand Prix (2nd MotoGP career win)
 2021 – 1st place at Catalunya. 3rd MotoGP class career win.
 2022 – 1st place at Indonesia. 4th MotoGP class career win.
 2022 – 1st place at Thailand. 5th MotoGP class career win.

Career statistics

Red Bull MotoGP Rookies Cup

Races by year
(key) (Races in bold indicate pole position, races in italics indicate fastest lap)

Grand Prix motorcycle racing

By season

By class

Races by year
(key) (Races in bold indicate pole position, races in italics indicate fastest lap)

References

External links

 
 Miguel Oliveira Fan Club
 Oliveira Cup
"Next Level"

1995 births
Living people
125cc World Championship riders
Moto3 World Championship riders
Portuguese motorcycle racers
Moto2 World Championship riders
Sportspeople from Almada
Tech3 MotoGP riders
MotoGP World Championship riders
KTM Factory Racing MotoGP riders
24H Series drivers
Portuguese racing drivers